Pūstelninkai (historically) is a village located in Kėdainiai district municipality, in Kaunas County, in central Lithuania. The village had a population of 0 people as of the 2011 census.

This village was abandoned during Soviet era land development projects and since then is inhabited (1970 was the last census year with population being detected).

Demography

References

Villages in Kaunas County
Kėdainiai District Municipality